Trimbach is a commune in the Bas-Rhin department of the Grand Est region of France. The village is located about 10 kilometers (6.2 miles) from the German border.

See also
 Communes of the Bas-Rhin department

References

Communes of Bas-Rhin